Thomas Jarzombek (born 28 April 1973) is a German politician of the Christian Democratic Union (CDU) who has been serving as a member of the Bundestag from the state of North Rhine-Westphalia since 2009.

Early life and education 
Jarzombek briefly studied business administration at the University of Düsseldorf but dropped out early to start his own IT service business in 1996.

Political career

Career in state politics 
From 2005 until 2009, Jarzombek served as a member of the State Parliament of North Rhine-Westphalia. During that time, he was his parliamentary group's spokesperson on media policy.

Member of the German Parliament, 2009–present 
Jarzombek first became a member of the Bundestag in the 2009 German federal election. He has since been a member of the Committee on Transport and Digital Infrastructure. He has also served on the Committee on Family Affairs, Senior Citizens, Women and Youth (2009–2013) and the Committee on the Digital Agenda (2013–2017). 

In the negotiations to form a coalition government under the leadership of Chancellor Angela Merkel following the 2017 federal elections, Jarzombek was part of the working group on digital policy, led Helge Braun, Dorothee Bär and Lars Klingbeil. From 2018 until 2021 he served as Commissioner for the Digital Industry and Start-ups and Federal Government Coordinator of German Aerospace Policy at the Federal Ministry for Economic Affairs and Energy. 

In 2021, Jarzombek announced his candidacy to succeed Carsten Linnemann as chair of MIT, the pro-business wing in the CDU/CSU; he ultimately lost an internal vote against Gitta Connemann.

Since the 2021 elections, Jarzombek has been a member of the Committee on Education, Research and Technology Assessment and the Committee on Digitization.

In the negotiations to form a coalition government of the CDU and Green Party under Minister-President of North Rhine-Westphalia Hendrik Wüst following the 2022 state elections, Jarzombek led his party’s delegation in the working group on education.

Other activities 
 Stiftung Lesen, Member of the Board of Trustees (since 2022)
 Fraunhofer Center for International Management and Knowledge Economy, Member of the Board of Trustees
 Quadriga Hochschule Berlin, Member of the Advisory Board on Politics and Public Affairs
 Federal Network Agency for Electricity, Gas, Telecommunications, Post and Railway (BNetzA), Member of the Advisory Board 
 KfW Capital, Member of the Advisory Board (2018–2022)

Political positions 
In June 2017, Jarzombek voted against Germany's introduction of same-sex marriage.

References

External links 

  
 Bundestag biography 

1973 births
Living people
Members of the Bundestag for North Rhine-Westphalia
Members of the Bundestag 2021–2025
Members of the Bundestag 2017–2021
Members of the Bundestag 2013–2017
Members of the Bundestag 2009–2013
Members of the Bundestag for the Christian Democratic Union of Germany